Khemchand Bohare, was a Dalit activist and social reformer.

Personal life 
Khemchand Bohare was born into Jatav community to Nannu Shah Bohare at Agra, Uttar Pradesh. He got his education from St. John's College and worked as a contractor in Great India Peninsula Railway (GIPR) between Bilaspur-Gondia and Nagpur sections.

Career 
In 1910, he left his job and started working for the upliftment of Chamar community. He organised people, i.e, Swami Achootanand, Manikchand Jatav, etc and founded Jatav Mahasabha for changing the identity from Chamar to Jatav. He worked for the upliftment, education and unity of untouchables.

In 1918, he was nominated as a member of Agra Municipal Council and later as District Education Board.

In 1922, he became member of United Provinces Legislative Council and remained until 1937. He also passed a resolution to appoint one member from the Depressed Classes to be member of District Boards of Municipality and Education in every district.

He also gave testimony in front of Simon Commission and declared as Vice President of All India Depressed Classes Association under Rao Sahib M.C.Rajah.

In 1937 Indian provincial elections he fought from Agra constituency but lost to Manik Chand Jatav.

References 

1875 births
1960 deaths
People from British India